The 2018 United States House of Representatives elections in Alabama were held on November 6, 2018, to elect the seven U.S. representatives from the state of Alabama, one from each of the state's seven congressional districts. The elections coincided with other elections to the House of Representatives, as well as elections to the United States Senate and various state and local elections. The primaries were held on June 5, with all choosing a nominee except the Republican primary in the 2nd district, which went to a July 17 runoff. The 2018 general election saw no change in Alabama's representation, remaining at a 6–1 GOP advantage, even though Democrats won over 40% of the statewide vote.

Overview

District
Results of the 2018 United States House of Representatives elections in Alabama by district:

District 1

The incumbent was Republican Bradley Byrne, who has represented the district since 2013. Byrne was re-elected with 96% of the vote in 2016, against nominal write-in opposition.

Democratic primary
 Robert Kennedy Jr.
 Lizzetta Hill McConnell, former president of NAACP Mobile County

Primary results

Republican primary
 Bradley Byrne, incumbent

General election

Results

District 2

The incumbent was Republican Martha Roby, who has represented the district since 2011. Roby was re-elected with 49% of the vote in 2016.

The Democratic Congressional Campaign Committee included Alabama's 2nd congressional district on its initial list of Republican-held seats considered targets in 2018.

Democratic primary
 Tabitha Isner, business analyst
 Audri Scott Williams

Primary results

Republican primary
 Tommy Amason, retired US Army Sergeant Major
 Bobby Bright, former Democratic congressman for AL-02 and former mayor of Montgomery
 Rich Hobson, former campaign manager for Senate candidate Roy Moore
 Barry Moore, state representative
 Martha Roby, incumbent

Primary results

Runoff results

General election

Results

District 3

The incumbent was Republican Mike Rogers, who has represented the district since 2003. Rogers was re-elected with 67% of the vote in 2016.

Democratic primary
 Mallory Hagan, news anchor and Miss America 2013
 Adia McClellan Winfrey, psychologist

Primary results

Republican primary
 Mike Rogers, incumbent

General election

Results

District 4

The incumbent was Republican Robert Aderholt, who has represented the district since 1997. Aderholt was re-elected with 99% of the vote in 2016 against nominal write-in opposition.

Democratic primary
 Lee Auman
 Rick Neighbors

Primary results

Republican primary

Primary results

General election

Results

District 5

The incumbent was Republican Mo Brooks, who has represented the district since 2011. Brooks was re-elected with 67% of the vote in 2016.

Democratic primary
 Peter Joffrion, former Huntsville City Attorney

Republican primary
 Mo Brooks, incumbent
 Clayton Hinchman, businessman and former U.S. Army Captain

Primary results

General election

Results

District 6

The incumbent was Republican Gary Palmer, who has represented the district since 2015. Palmer was re-elected with 74% of the vote in 2016.

Democratic primary
 Danner Kline, businessman

Republican primary
 Gary Palmer, incumbent

General election

Results

District 7

The incumbent was Democrat Terri Sewell, who has represented the district since 2011. Sewell was re-elected with 98% of the vote in 2016 against nominal write-in opposition.

Democratic primary
 Terri Sewell, incumbent

General election

Results

References

External links

  at
Vote: Support Democracy in your District
Candidates at Vote Smart
Candidates at Ballotpedia
Campaign finance at FEC
Campaign finance at OpenSecrets

Official campaign websites of first district candidates
Bradley Byrne (R) for Congress
Robert Kennedy Jr. (D) for Congress

Official campaign websites of second district candidates
Tabitha Isner (D) for Congress
Martha Roby (R) for Congress

Official campaign websites of third district candidates
Mallory Hagan (D) for Congress
Mike Rogers (R) for Congress

Official campaign websites of fourth district candidates
Robert Aderholt (R) for Congress
Lee Auman (D) for Congress

Official campaign websites of fifth district candidates
Mo Brooks (R) for Congress
Peter Joffrion (D) for Congress

Official campaign websites of sixth district candidates
Danner Kline (D) for Congress
Gary Palmer (R) for Congress

Official campaign websites of seventh district candidates
Terri Sewell (D) for Congress

2018
Alabama
United States House of Representatives